Milana is a 2007 Indian Kannada-language romantic comedy drama film co-written and directed by Prakash, starring Puneeth Rajkumar, and Parvathy Thiruvothu in lead roles. The film was Parvathy's debut in Kannada cinema. The movie also features Pooja Gandhi, Dileep Raj, Sumithra and Mukhyamantri Chandru in prominent roles. Music for the film was composed by Mano Murthy.

Upon theatrical release on 14 September 2007, the film saw massive commercial success and completed a 500-day run in theatres making it the longest running Indian film ever in the history of Multiplexes. Puneeth's performance won him the Karnataka State Film Award for Best Actor. The film was dubbed into Malayalam as Ishtam Enikkishtam.

The film was remade in Odia in 2014 as Something Something 2 and in Bengali in 2016 as Ki Kore Toke Bolbo thereby becoming the fourth Kannada movie after Anuraga Aralithu , Appu and Mungaru Male to be remade in two non-Hindi non-South Indian languages.
The 2013 Tamil film Raja Rani was reported to have been inspired by this movie.

Plot
Aakash is a RJ for Radio Mirchi station in Bangalore, who is married to Anjali at Mysore. At their first night, Anjali demands a divorce from Aakash. Instead of showing any kind of frustration, Aakash calmly agrees to give divorce to Anjali, on the condition that only after they move to Bangalore and also requests Anjali to keep this as a secret from his parents, as he fears they would not be able to handle it.

Anjali agrees where it is revealed that Anjali was never interested in the wedding as she was already in love with Hemanth, whom she is also struggling to find after her father forbade her to see him again and Aakash had married Anjali due to his parents's wishes, as his love interest Priya is forcibly married by her parents.

As the days pass, Aakash and Anjali face off on various fronts, clearly letting that their marriage is on the rocks. However, when Aakash rescues his neighbor from a local goon, Anjali realizes that Aakash is not such a bad person after all. She requests Aakash to help her find Hemanth, to which he agrees. Soon, Aakash manages to locate Hemanth, and also keeps his word by applying for divorce, and as per the rules, the court grants them 6 months time if they want to reconsider their application.

Anjali learns that Hemanth is a fraud and had demanded money from Anjali's father to end his relationship with her, which leaves her devastated as she feels that her whole life is now ruined. Dejected, she attempts suicide only to be saved by Aakash in the nick of time. Post this event, Aakash and Anjali undergo a transformation where Aakash manages to win Anjali's respect, and soon they become best friends.

Soon enough, Anjali realizes that she has fallen for Aakash, who has helped her through so much of hardships. However, she realizes that she cannot express her love to him as it would make her look small in Aakash's eyes. Caught in a perpetual emotional dilemma, she struggles to hide her feelings from him. A few days later, the court summons them and approves their divorce.

Anjali is once again devastated as Aakash feels no remorse in signing the papers. Anjali decides that she cannot stay in India anymore and decides to move to the US. However, Aakash begins to feel a strange sense of loss after he bids Anjali goodbye. He later realizes that Anjali was in love with him and he too was in love with her.

Aakash rushes to the airport to prevent her from leaving the country. After a tense fight between Hemanth (who wants to avenge the humiliation when Aakash had thrashed him in the nightclub) and his henchman. Aakash and Anjali reunite where he jokingly taunts Anjali that now he has to spend the rest of his life with her.

Cast

 Puneeth Rajkumar as Aakash
 Parvathy Thiruvothu as Anjali, Aakash's wife
 Pooja Gandhi as Priya (Aakash's ex-lover)
 Dileep Raj as Hemant (Anjali's ex-lover)
 Sumithra as Aakash's mother
 Mukhyamantri Chandru as Aakash's father
 Sihi Kahi Chandru as Flat Manager
 Rangayana Raghu as Beggar Kubera
 Apoorvashree as Kubera's wife 
 Shobaraj as Local Rowdy
 Niranjan Shetty as Raghu, Aakash's friend
 Sanchita Shetty as Raghu's lover
 Suresh Mangalooru as Anjali's father
 Shankar Rao as neighbour
 B. Jaya as neighbour's wife
 Umesh as a divorce lawyer
 Shankar Bhat
 Nagatihalli Chandrashekhar in a guest appearance as a senior lawyer
 Kishori Ballal in a guest appearance
 Akul Balaji as Priya's husband, a police officer

Soundtrack

The soundtrack is made up of the following songs:

Critical response 
Rediff.com rating 3.5 out of 5 and stating that "Puneet Rajkumar has shown a lot of maturity in his performance. Pooja Gandhi, the 'Mungaru Male' heroine impresses by her song with Puneet is certainly the highlight of the film. Parvathi has done her best.

Box-office and performance
 The film successfully ran for 50 days in 137 centers in Karnataka, and 100 days in 50 centers, 175 days in 7 centres and 450 Days in PVR, Bangalore which records only the second Indian movie to see a run of more than 365 days in any Indian multiplex after Mungaru Male and the longest running Indian Film in the history of Multiplexes

Awards
Filmfare Awards South
 Best Music Director for Mano Murthy
 Best Male Playback Singer for Sonu Nigam to the song "Ninnindale"

State awards
 Best Actor – Puneeth Rajkumar (Won)

References

External links
 

2000s Kannada-language films
2007 films
Films set in Bangalore
Films scored by Mano Murthy
Films shot in Bangalore
Indian romantic drama films
Kannada films remade in other languages
Indian nonlinear narrative films
2007 romantic drama films